Ruelleen Angel Orquia Olano (born May 3, 2006), better known by her stage name Mutya Orquia, is a Filipina teen actress, best known for her titular roles as a mermaid in Mutya (2011), young Jade Dimagiba in My Binondo Girl (2011–12) and as Abigail Ruth "Abby" Lim in Be Careful With My Heart (2012–14).

Biography
In early October, Orquia was announced to be featured in Shake, Rattle & Roll 14, an official entry to the annual Metro Manila Film Festival. The film was scheduled to be released on December 25, 2012 and was to be Orquia's first big screen appearance. However, in November 2012, Orquia's name was removed in the final cast list.

Mutya Orquia received the Best Child Performance award for her performance as Abby Lim in Be Careful With My Heart at the 4th FMTM Awards 2012 for TV Entertainment.

It was announced in June 2013 that Orquia was to reprise her role as Abby in a theatrical adaptation of Be Careful With My Heart, which was to be included in the 2013 Metro Manila Film Festival, but was later scrapped due to schedule constraints with the cast.

In 2014, Orquia lent her vocals on the opening song of Be Careful with My Heart (The Lullaby Album) entitled Angel Of God released under Star Music.

She was a regular cast member on the children's sketch comedy show  Goin' Bulilit, having been a mainstay from 2012 to 2019.

As of 2021, following ABS-CBN's shutdown operation in 2020 due to franchise renewal issue, Orquia transferred to TV5 network. Her first Kapatid Teleserye, is entitled Niña Niño, where she co-stars with former kapamilya stars Maja Salvador and Noel Comia Jr.

Prior to transferring network Orquia reunited with Janella Salvador in season 2 episode of  Click, Like, Share entitled  Barter in iWantTFC.

Filmography

Television

Digital Media

Discography

Album

Concert

Awards and nominations

References

2006 births
Living people
Star Magic
ABS-CBN personalities
Star Magic personalities
TV5 (Philippine TV network) personalities
People from Quezon City
Filipino child actresses
Filipino television actresses
Filipino television personalities
Filipino female models
Filipino people of Spanish descent
Filipino people of Mexican descent